In mathematics, a filtered algebra is a generalization of the notion of a graded algebra. Examples appear in many branches of mathematics, especially in homological algebra and representation theory. 

A filtered algebra over the field  is an algebra  over  that has an increasing sequence  of subspaces of  such that 

and that is compatible with the multiplication in the following sense:

Associated graded algebra
In general there is the following construction that produces a graded algebra out of a filtered algebra. 

If  is a filtered algebra then the associated graded algebra   is defined as follows: 

Examples

The symmetric algebra on the dual of an affine space is a filtered algebra of polynomials; on a vector space, one instead obtains a graded algebra.

The universal enveloping algebra of a Lie algebra  is also naturally filtered.  The PBW theorem states that the associated graded algebra is simply .

Scalar differential operators on a manifold  form a filtered algebra where the filtration is given by the degree of differential operators. The associated graded algebra is the commutative algebra of smooth functions on the cotangent bundle  which are polynomial along the fibers of the projection .

The group algebra of a group with a length function is a filtered algebra.

See also
 Filtration (mathematics)
 Length function

References

Algebras
Homological algebra